Kevin James Willcock (born 8 March 1973) is a former English cricketer.  Willcock was a right-handed batsman who bowled right-arm medium pace.  He was born at Tavistock, Devon.

Willcock made his Minor Counties Championship debut for Cornwall in 1993 against Devon.  From 1993 to 1998, he represented the county in 34 Minor Counties Championship matches, the last of came match against Herefordshire.  Willcock also represented Cornwall in the MCCA Knockout Trophy.  His debut in that competition came against Devon in 1995. From 1995 to 1998, he represented the county in 7 Trophy matches, the last of which came against Devon.

Willcock also represented Cornwall in 2 List A matches.  These came against Middlesex in the 1995 NatWest Trophy and Warwickshire in the 1996 NatWest Trophy.  In his 2 List A matches, he scored 26 runs at a batting average of 13.00, with a high score of 25.  In the field he took a single catch.  With the ball he took 2 wickets at a bowling average of 47.50, with best figures of 1/43.

Family
His father Eric also played List A and Minor Counties for Cornwall.

References

External links
Kevin Willcock at Cricinfo
Kevin Willcock at CricketArchive

1973 births
Living people
Sportspeople from Tavistock
Cricketers from Devon
English cricketers
Cornwall cricketers